Zuhal Topal (born 23 September 1975) is a Turkish actress and TV presenter. She has presented Turkish TV programmes. Topal graduated from Istanbul Architecture Faculty Interior Architecture. She took a variety of roles by acting in many films.

Filmography

Television series

 Avrupa Avrupa: Nermin (2011–2013) TRT1
 Geniş Aile: Şukufe 2011 (episode 71) (Star)
 Geniş Aile: Şukufe 2009–2010 (Kanal D)
 Papatyam: Guest appearance 2009 (Star TV)
 Komedi Türk: Herself 2008 (Fox TV)
 Kaybolan Yıllar: Yonca
 Tutkunum Sana: Suna 2006
 Selena: Fitnat 2006 (ATV)
 Arka Sokaklar 2006
 Tarık ve Diğerleri: Kehribar 2006 (STV)
 Haylaz Babam  2005
 El Bebek Gül Bebek: Teyze 2005
 Avrupa Yakası: Guest appearance 2004
 Sihirli Annem: Suzan 2003 (Kanal D)
 Ev Hali: Mine 2002 (Show TV)
 Lahmacun ve Pizza 2002
 Reyting Hamdi 2002
 Çekirdek Aile 2000 (Kanal D)
 Zehirli Çiçek 2000 Show TV
 Dadı: Hostess 2000
 Sevda Kondu: İlknur 1999 Kanal 6
 Ruhsar 1997 (Kanal D)
 Kurşun Kalem 1996
 Yazlıkçılar 1996 (Star TV)
 Kara Melek 1996
 Çiçek Taksi 1995
 Palavra Aşklar 1995

Film 
 Suluboya: Zuhal 2002
 Deli Deli Olma: Figan 2010
 Yol Palas Cinayeti: Sacide 2004
 Kirpi: Nergis 2009

References

External links
http://www.biyografist.com/biyografiler/Zuhal-Topal-biyografisi.html

1976 births
Living people
Actresses from Istanbul
Turkish television actresses
Turkish television presenters
Turkish women television presenters
Turkish film actresses